Arbol or Árbol (Spanish: árbol, 'tree') may refer to:
 , a parish in Vilalba, Spain
 , a parish in Antas de Ulla, Spain
 Field of Arbol, a name for the Solar System in C. S. Lewis' Space Trilogy

See also 
 Chile de árbol, a chili pepper
 
 Arboll, a place in Scotland
 Albor
 Abrol
 Arbor (disambiguation)